East Lancashire Railway is a   heritage railway line in North West England which runs between Heywood, Greater Manchester and Rawtenstall in Lancashire. There are intermediate stations at Bury Bolton Street, Summerseat and Ramsbottom, with the line crossing the border into Rossendale serving Irwell Vale and Rawtenstall. Before closure, the line terminated at Bacup.

Overview
Passenger services between Bury and Rawtenstall were withdrawn by British Rail on 3 June 1972.  Coal services to Rawtenstall ended in 1980 and formal closure of the line followed in 1982. The East Lancashire Railway Trust reopened the line on 25 July 1987.  The initial service operated between Bury and Ramsbottom, via Summerseat. In 1991, the service was extended northwards from Ramsbottom to reach Rawtenstall, via Irwell Vale. However, two original stations on the line, closed to passengers by BR in 1972, have not reopened, Ewood Bridge & Edenfield and Stubbins. The latter was the junction of the lines to Accrington and Rossendale although there were no platforms serving these lines.

Rawtenstall is the practical northern limit of the line, as the formation on towards Bacup has been lost immediately north of the station.

In September 2003, an eastbound extension from Bury to Heywood was re-opened. To reach Heywood, the extension had to cross over the Manchester Metrolink line to Bury, at the site of the former Bury Knowsley Street station.  This necessitated the construction of a new intersection bridge, with steeply graded approaches of 1 in 36 and 1 in 41 nicknamed The Ski Jump.

On 13 October 2016, the new  station was officially opened by the Mayor of Bury, where locomotive no. 4472 Flying Scotsman pulled the first train to stop at the station with a bagpipe rendition of 'Scotland the Brave' signalling its arrival.

The remainder of the extension includes a long section at 1 in 85, rising towards Heywood, as the preserved railway line climbs out of the Irwell valley.

The ELR is planning to extend the running line to Castleton in the future, with a new cross platform interchange being the preferred option.

 options for providing an interchange station at Castleton between East Lancashire Railway and National Rail services were being explored. Plans for the station were supported by Rochdale Borough Council, which hoped to fund it by adjacent land development. A rail connection with the Metrolink line also exists, just south of Bury, at Buckley Wells. This was formerly the connection to the Electric Car Shops, where the Class 504 EMU sets were maintained, and was created when BR services were diverted to Bury Interchange in 1980.

The railway is open every weekend of the year, holding a number of themed events and galas throughout the year, which include steam and diesel events, and also offers driver experience courses. The Day out with Thomas events made a return to the railway after a two-year absence, following fresh negotiations, having previously been unable to reach an agreement in 2009 with HIT Entertainment, the owners of the Thomas brand. While Thomas was absent, the ELR operated Family Engines Big Day Out events featuring alternative engines with faces, such as Jimmy the Jinty.

The railway is run by volunteer members from the East Lancashire Railway Preservation Society (ELRPS). The railway is well known for its collection of diesel locomotives which reside on the railway, along with over 140 carriages, wagons and utility vehicles.  Although the ELR does offer a local residents' discount card, and many residents do use the trains at weekends, it does not claim to offer a true commuter service either in levels of services or fares.

In the 1990s, the railway was featured in the 1991 film Let Him Have It and in the finale of ITV's comedy series The Grimleys, named The Grimley Curse set in 1978. In 2007, during the finale of BBC One's award-winning drama series Life on Mars, set in 1973, a class 47 was used for scenes of an armed robbery at Brooksbottom Tunnel.

The railway also featured in an episode of Coronation Street, transmitted on August Bank Holiday 2010, when Hayley and Roy Cropper travelled to their wedding aboard an ELR train of Mark 1 coaches hauled by LMS "Black 5" No. 44871, which carried 45407's Lancashire Fusilier nameplates for the occasion. The line also starred in the BBC television film Eric and Ernie, aired on New Year's Day 2011, about the early career of the British comedy act Morecambe and Wise. Bury Bolton Street station was featured, along with a train of Mark 1 coaches hauled by LMS "Black 5" No. 44871. In 2014, the railway was featured in a week of episodes of Hollyoaks (broadcast 3–7 November) which featured a crash involving BR Class 14 no. D9531 "Ernest".

In October 2014, Ramsbottom Station and the adjacent level crossing on Bridge Street was featured in the 2017 movie A Monster Calls, which was the scene for an emotional peak in the movie, starring Sigourney Weaver in a Volvo estate car waiting for a BR DMU, in Rail Blue livery, to pass through the crossing.

In 2019, the CityMetric website published a "fantasy" tram link expansion proposal to create an orbital extension to the Manchester Metrolink tram system, which would include part of the current East Lancashire Railway route between Bury and Heywood.

In January 2019, Campaign for Better Transport released a report identifying the line which was listed as Priority 2 for reopening. Priority 2 is for those lines which require further development or a change in circumstances (such as housing developments).

Railway stations of the ELR

Locomotives and multiple units

The ELR is home to a mixed collection of small to large designs, some of which are main-line certified. These often visit other heritage lines or can be found operating mainline excursions, especially during the summer season (March–October).

Steam locomotives

Operational

Visitors

Operational but away from the ELR

Locomotives out of action

Locomotives in store/static display

Diesel
The ELR is home to one of the largest preserved diesel fleets on a UK heritage railway. Many locomotives are owned by private individuals or an owning group, which co-operate as the ELR Diesel Group.

Operational diesel locomotives

Operational DMUs
BR Class 104 unit 50455+50517, BR Blue. Built in 1957.
BR Class 105 unit 51485+56121, BR Green. Built in 1956–1959.
BR Class 110 unit 51813+59701+51842. BR Green. Built in 1959.
BR Class 122 unit W55001. BR Blue. Built in 1958.
BR Class 144 unit 144009. Great Midlands Trains (Fictitious). Built in 1986

Operational, but away from the ELR
BR Class 37 No. 37418 (D6971), BR Large Logo Blue (minus name and numbers). Built in 1965. (On hire to Colas Rail)
BR Class 47 No. 47402 (D1501), BR Two-Tone Green. Built in 1962.

Non-operational Diesel locomotives and DMUs

Non-operational Diesel locomotives

DMUs out of action
BR Class 104 unit 53437+59137+53494. Built in 1957. (Stored awaiting restoration)
BR Class 121 unit 56289. Built in 1960. (Under overhaul)
BR Class 207 unit 1305 (207202) 60130+70549+60904 (Bodywork overhaul of 60130 and 60904, Buckley Wells shed)
NIR Class 80 No. 99 (bought as spares for 1305, now converted to standard gauge at Buckley Wells)

Electric

Electric multiple units 
BR Class 504 unit 65451+77172 (stored at Buckley Wells, being restored as hauled coaching stock).

Former residents on the ELR

Note that the locations given may not be current as locomotives move between railways from time to time.

Steam

Diesel

Reinstatement proposals
As part of the Government's 'Restoring Your Railway' fund, the route between Rochdale railway station and Bury Bolton Street ELR station was identified as a route for re-opening. As of 23 May 2020, the bid had made it past the first stage of the 'ideas fund'.

References

Further reading

External links

East Lancashire Railway website
Bury Standard Four Group for BR Standard Class 4 80097
ELR Bury Diesel Group website
Lancashire and Yorkshire Railway website
Riley & Sons (E) Ltd, Owners of 45407 and 44871
Class 40 Preservation Society, Owners of 40106, 40145 and D335
D1041 Western Prince Website
Class 15 Preservation Society, Owners of D8233
Class 14 D9531
British Railways in 1960 - The ELR from Bury Bolton Street to Stubbins Jn.
British Railways in 1960 - The ELR from Stubbins Jn. to Rawtenstall (Part of the route from Stubbins Jn. to Bacup)
'The Castleton and Heywood Masterplan' - Moucel & Rochdale MBC study regarding a possible ELR extension to Castleton.

Heritage railways in Greater Manchester
Heritage railways in Lancashire
Tourist attractions in the Metropolitan Borough of Bury
Tourist attractions in the Metropolitan Borough of Rochdale
Railway companies established in 1987